Calthalotia is an Australian genus of sea snails, marine gastropod molluscs in the family Trochidae, the top shells.

Species
Species with names in current use within the genus Calthalotia include:
 Calthalotia arruensis (Watson, 1880)
 Calthalotia baudini (Fischer, 1878) 
 Calthalotia fragum (Philippi, 1848)  
 Calthalotia modesta (Thiele, 1930)
 Calthalotia mundula (Adams & Angas, 1864) 
 Calthalotia strigata (Adams, 1853)

Species brought into synonymy
 Calthalotia comtessi (Iredale, 1931): synonym of  Calthalotia fragum (Philippi, 1848)
 Calthalotia indistincta (Wood, 1828): synonym of  Calthalotia comtessi (Iredale, 193)1 - C. indistincta has priority over C. comtessi, according to Jansen (1993).
 Calthalotia marginata (Tenison-Woods, J.E., 1880): synonym of Calthalotia arruensis (Watson, 1880)
 Calthalotia nitidissima Ludbrook, N.H. 1941: synonym of Calthalotia arruensis (Watson, 1880)
 Calthalotia porteri Iredale, 1940: synonym of Prothalotia porteri (Iredale, 1940)

References

 Wilson, B., 1993. Australian Marine Shells. Prosobranch Gastropods Pt I. Odyssey Publishing, Leederville, W.A

External links

 
Trochidae
Gastropod genera